The Ehrnrooth family is a Finnish noble family of German origin. It originated from Pomerania, and came to Finland from Livonia around 1600. Its status descends from Johan Plagman (1623–1696), who was raised to nobility in 1687. The family was registered in the Finnish House of Nobility in 1818. Members of the Ehrnrooth family has historically belonged to the Swedish-speaking population of Finland.

Many members of the family have been prominent in Finland's business community.

Members of the family 

 Adelaïde Ehrnrooth (1826–1905), writer, feminist
 Adolf Ehrnrooth (1905–2004), general
 Adolf Reinhold Ehrnrooth, general
 Alexander Ehrnrooth (b. 1974), businessman
 Anthony Ehrnrooth (b. 1984), Country manager of Skynet Worldwide Express Finland, cinematographer, editor and blogger
 Casimir Ehrnrooth (1931–2015), businessman, chairman of Nokia
 Gay Ehrnrooth (1925–2006), businessman
 Georg C. Ehrnrooth (1926–2010), politician
 Georg Larsson Ehrnrooth|Georg Ehrnrooth (b. 1940), businessman
 Göran Ehrnrooth (1905–1996), banker, father of Casimir (1931–2015), Göran J. (b. 1934), Robert (b. 1939) and Elsa Margaretha Louise (b. 1942)
 Göran J. Ehrnrooth (b. 1934), CEO of Fiskars, father of Alexander (b. 1974) and Albert (b. 1976) Alexander Ehrnrooth is the main owner of Tiimari since 2006 (Finnish shops with paper, party and consumption ware).
 Gustaf Ehrnrooth (1898–1983), general
 Gustaf Adolf Ehrnrooth (1779–1848), general
 Gustaf Robert Ehrnrooth (1821–1911), general
 Hans Ehrnrooth (b. 1974), businessman
 Henrik Ehrnrooth (b. 1969), finance manager of Kone and member of Board of Directors
 Johann Casimir Ehrnrooth (1833–1913), lieutenant general
 Leo Ehrnrooth (1877–1951), politician
 Mia Mikela Ehrnrooth (b. 1987), actress and model
 Nina Ehrnrooth (b. 1962), alpine skier

Göran Ehrnrooth 1905–1996 
Göran Ehrnrooth was a bank manager in Union Bank Finland. Göran Ehrnrooth was married to Louise von Julin, daughter of  Jacob von Julin, the CEO of Kaukas paper factory. Their children are Casimir Ehrnrooth (b. 1931) UPM-Kymmene CEO, Göran J. Ehrnrooth (b. 1934), Robert Ehrnrooth (b. 1939) EFFOA-Suomen Höyrylaiva CEO and Elsa Margaretha Louise Fromond (b. 1942).

Casimir Ehrnrooth's children are Henrik Ehrnrooth (b. 1954), CEO of Pöyry, Johanna Ehrnrooth (1958–2020), painter, Georg J. C. Ehrnrooth (b. 1966), and Carl-Gustaf Ehrnrooth (b. 1969), a member of Guggenheim Foundation Board of Directors since September 2008.

References 

Finnish noble families
Ehrnrooth family